José María Merino is a Spanish novelist born in A Coruña, Galicia on 5 March 1941. He is the father of two daughters, María and Ana, both of them university professors. (Ana Merino is also a poet.) He lived for several years in León and currently lives in Madrid. Best known for his novels and short stories, he is also a poet and a travel writer.

He is considered one of the most prominent contemporary Spanish writers. His literary production is impressive both in terms of quantity and quality. He cultivates all narrative forms, poetry, and literary essay. He has received many important awards and distinctions. A master of the short-story, he has edited important collections of short-stories and tales. Mr. Merino is also an experienced teacher, someone who enjoys sharing his expertise with younger writers and students. He has conducted numerous workshops and creative writing courses and seminars in different Universities and Writing Schools, such as Dartmouth College (Hanover), the Universidad Complutense (Madrid), Universidad Carlos III (Madrid), Universidad International Menéndez y Pelayo (Santander), Escuela de Escritores Alonso Quijano or La Escuela de Letras.

Merino was elected to Seat m of the Real Academia Española on 27 March 2008, he took up his seat on 19 April 2009.

Books

Novels
El río del Edén 2013 National Novel Prize (Spain)
El lugar sin culpa (Ed. Alfaguara 2007) Gonzalo Torrente Ballester Award
El heredero (Ed, Alfaguara, 2003). Ramón Gómez de la Serna Award
Novelas del mito ( Ed. Alfaguara, 2000). (Compilation: El caldero de oro, La orilla oscura y El centro del aire)
Los invisibles (Ed. Espasa Calpe, 2000)
Las visiones de Lucrecia ( Ed. Alfaguara, 1996). Miguel Delibes Award
Las crónicas mestizas ( Ed. Alfaguara, 1992). (Compilation: El oro de los sueños, La tierra del tiempo perdido y Las lágrimas del sol)
Los trenes del verano -No soy un libro ( Ed. Siruela, 1992). National Award of Youth Literature
El centro del aire (Ed. Alfaguara, 1991)
Las lágrimas del sol (Ed. Alfaguara, 1989)
La tierra del tiempo perdido (Ed. Alfaguara, 1987)
El oro de los sueños (Ed. Alfaguara, 1986)
La orilla oscura (Ed. Alfaguara, 1985). Critics National Award
El caldero de oro (Ed. Alfaguara, 1981)
Novela de Andrés Choz (Ed. Novelas y Cuentos 1976). Award for the best novel: Novelas y Cuentos Award

Short stories collections
La glorieta de los fugitivos (Ed. Páginas de Espuma, 2007)
Cuentos del libro de la noche (Ed. Alfaguara,  2005)
Cuentos de los días raros (Ed. Alfaguara, 2004)
Días imaginarios (Seix Barral 2002). NH Award of short stories to the year best short stories book published
La memoria tramposa (Edilesa, 1999)
Cuatro nocturnos (Ed. Alfaguara 1999)
Cincuenta cuentos y una fábula. Obra breve 1982-1997 (Ed. Alfaguara 1997)
Cuentos del Barrio del Refugio (Ed. Alfaguara 1994)
El viajero perdido (Ed. Alfaguara 1990)
Artrópodos y Hadanes (Ollero y Ramos, 1987)
Cuentos del reino secreto (Ed. Alfaguara 1982)

Collections of literary essays and articles
Ficción continua (Seix Barral, 2004)
Silva leonesa (Breviarios de la Calle del Pez 1998)

Memoirs
Tres semanas de mal dormir (Seix Barral, 2006)
Intramuros (Edilesa, 1998)

Poetry
Cumpleaños lejos de casa. Poesía reunida. Seix Barral, Barcelona, 2006
Cumpleaños lejos de casa. Obra poética completa. Endymion, Madrid, 1987
Mírame Medusa y otros poemas.  Endymion, Madrid, 1984
Cumpleaños lejos de casa. Provincia, León, 1973
Sitio de Tarifa. Helios, Madrid, 1972

Books for children
Adiós al cuaderno de hojas blancas (Anaya, 1998)
Regreso al cuaderno de hojas blancas (Anaya, 1997)
El cuaderno de hojas blancas (Anaya, 1996)
La edad de la aventura (Ed. Alfaguara, 1995)

Collaborative work
Los narradores cautivos (Alfaguara, 1999). Novel. With Jesús F. Martínez and Antonio Martínez Menchén
Sabino Ordás, Las cenizas del Fénix (Calambur, 1985). Journalistic articles with Juan Pedro Aparicio and Luis Mateo Díez
León, traza y memoria (1984). Book of Art. With Luis Mateo Díez and Antonio Gamoneda
Los caminos del Esla (Everest, 1980). Travels Book. With Juan Pedro Aparicio
Parnasillo Provincial de poetas apócrifos (Papalaguinda poética, 1975). With Agustín Delgado and Luis Mateo Díez

Editor of anthologies
Leyendas españolas de todos los tiempos. Una memoria soñada (Temas de hoy, 2000)
Los mejores relatos españoles del siglo XX (Alfaguara, 1998)
Cien años de cuentos españoles en castellano (1898–1998) (Alfaguara, 1998)

References

External links 
 Address to the Real Academia de la Lengua Española by José María Merino (in Spanish)
 Monographic on José María Merino at OtroLunes

1941 births
Living people
People from A Coruña
Writers from Galicia (Spain)
Spanish male writers
Members of the Royal Spanish Academy